is a railway station on the Osaka Metro Imazatosuji Line and the West Japan Railway Company (JR West) Katamachi Line (Gakkentoshi Line) and Osaka Higashi Line in Jōtō-ku, Osaka, Japan.

Lines
JR West
Katamachi Line (Gakkentoshi Line)
Osaka Higashi Line 
 Imazatosuji Line (Station Number: I19)

Layout

JR West
There are two side platforms with two elevated tracks. Construction on two additional tracks and one new platform on the south side of the station began in July 2011; when the Osaka-Higashi Line is extended to this station, it will use the existing tracks and platforms, with the Gakkentoshi Line moving to the two newly constructed tracks. The station will have two side platforms and one island platform in the middle, serving four tracks.

Osaka Metro
There is an island platform with two tracks underground.  The platform is fenced with platform gates.

History 
Station numbering was introduced in March 2018 with Shigino being assigned station number JR-H40.

The platforms of the Gakkentoshi Line were moved to new tracks in 2019 to make way for the opening of the second phase of the Osaka-Higashi Line.

Adjacent stations

|-

References 

Jōtō-ku, Osaka
Railway stations in Osaka
Osaka Metro stations
Railway stations in Japan opened in 1933
Railway stations in Japan opened in 2006
Stations of West Japan Railway Company